Korea International School may refer to:

 Korea International School (South Korea), an Anglophone international school with campuses in South Korea
 Korea International School (Japan), a Korean international school in Osaka

See also
 Korean International School (disambiguation)